Ghazemabad (also Romanized as Ghāzemābād; also known as ‘Āzemābād, Kāz̧emābād, and Kāzimābād) is a village in Aq Kahriz Rural District, Nowbaran District, Saveh County, Markazi Province, Iran. At the 2006 census, its population was 354, in 112 families.

References 

Populated places in Saveh County